The Golden Globe Awards  are accolades bestowed by recognizing excellence in film, both American and international, and American television.

Golden Globe Award for Best Motion Picture may also refer to:

Golden Globe Award for Best Motion Picture – Drama
Golden Globe Award for Best Motion Picture – Musical or Comedy